Priva is a Dutch privately owned high-tech company in the climate control field, specializing in smart building automation, greenhouse technology & indoor farming. It sells services, equipment and software for climate and process control in horticulture and for buildings, being the world leader in the field in horticulture. . The company is one of the leading technology and service providers for sustainable urban deltas: circular economies based on green tech and Smart Buildings.

Priva is headquartered in De Lier and has an international presence with 18 offices in other parts of the world. The company  employs over 600 people worldwide, of which some 450 in the Netherlands.

References

External links
Official website
Priva Campus

Companies based in South Holland
Horticultural companies